Our Lady of Victory or Our Lady of Victories is one of several titles for the Blessed Virgin Mary, discussed at Our Lady of the Rosary.

It also may refer to:

Churches

Canada
 Notre-Dame-des-Victoires, Quebec City, Quebec
 Our Lady of Victory Church (Inuvik), also called the "Igloo Church", Northwest Territories

Italy
 Santa Maria della Vittoria, PP
 
 Santa Maria della Vittoria, Rome

Malta
 Church of Our Lady of Victory (Valletta)
 Our Lady of Victories Parish Church, Senglea

United States
 St. Mary of Victories Church, St. Louis, Missouri
 Our Lady of Victory Basilica (Lackawanna, New York)
 Our Lady of Victory Church (Bronx, New York)
 Our Lady of Victory Church (Brooklyn, New York)
 Our Lady of Victory Church (Manhattan), New York, also called the "War Memorial Church"
 Our Lady of Victory Roman Catholic Church, Rochester, New York
 Our Lady of Victory (Cincinnati), Delhi Township, Ohio

Other countries
 Our Lady of Victories Basilica, Camberwell, Camberwell, Victoria, Australia
 Church of Our Lady Victorious, Prague, Czech Republic
 Our Lady of Victories Church, Kolar district, Karnataka, India
 Notre-Dame-des-Victoires, Paris, France
 Church of Our Lady of Victories, Sallynoggin, Dublin, Ireland
 St Mary, Our Lady of Victories Church, Dundee, Scotland, UK

Schools
 Our Lady of Victory Academy, Dobbs Ferry, New York, U.S.
 Our Lady of Victory Academy (Fort Worth, Texas), U.S.
 Our Lady of Victory Catholic School, Toronto, Ontario, Canada
 Nolan Catholic High School, formerly named Our Lady of Victory High School, in Fort Worth, Texas, U.S.

Other
 Derham Hall and Our Lady of Victory Chapel, College of Saint Catherine, St. Paul, Minnesota
 Our Lady of Victory (film), an alternate title for the film The Mighty Macs
 Franciscan Sisters of Our Lady of Victory
 Original name for the feast of Our Lady of the Rosary

See also
 Our Lady of Victory Cathedral (disambiguation)